Superchick is a 1973 American action comedy exploitation film directed by Ed Forsyth and starring Joyce Jillson, Louis Quinn, Thomas Reardon, Tony Young, and Timothy Wayne Brown. The film was released by Crown International Pictures in September 1973.

Plot
Tara B. True, played by Joyce Jillson, enjoys her jet set lifestyle, living different "lives" as she flies across the continent.  But her different lives collide during an attempted aircraft hijacking and it's up to "Superchick", with her karate skills, to save the day.

Cast

Joyce Jillson as Tara B. True/Superchick
Louis Quinn as Garrick (as Louie Quinn)
Thomas Reardon as Ernest
Tony Young as Johnny
Timothy Wayne Brown as Davy (as Timothy Wayne-Brown)
John Carradine as Igor Smith
Junero Jennings as Sims
Steve Drexel as Pete
James Carroll Jordan as Marine
Jack Wells as Announcer
Gus Peters as Flasher
Norman Bartold as Old Policeman
Phil Hoover as Tommy Hooks
Fuji as Aki
Dale Ishimoto as Karate Instructor
Marland Proctor as Co-Pilot
Uschi Digard as Mayday
Gary Crutcher as Young Policeman
John Donovan as Bagman
Lilyan McBride as Little Old Lady (as Lilyan MacBride)
Flo Lawrence as Party Girl (as Flo Gerrish)
Candy Samples as Lady on Boat (as Mary Gavin)
Myron Griffin as Nudie Producer
Ralph Campbell as Butler
Jana Scott as Stewardess
Matthew Forsyth as Little Boy
Rick Cassidy as Dungeon Master on Movie Set (uncredited)
Dan Haggerty as Biker with Bandana (uncredited)
Jay Scott as Bodyguard in Tan Suit (uncredited)
Ray Sebastian as Movie Crew Member in Black (uncredited)

References

External links

Superchick on Rotten Tomatoes

1970s action comedy films
American action comedy films
1973 films
Crown International Pictures films
1970s exploitation films
1973 comedy films
1970s English-language films
1970s American films